The Costa Rican pygmy owl (Glaucidium costaricanum) is a small "typical owl" in subfamily Surniinae. It is found in Costa Rica and Panama.

Taxonomy and systematics

The Costa Rican pygmy owl was originally described as a subspecies of the Andean pygmy owl (G. jardinii). In 2000 the North American Classification Committee (NACC) of what was then the American Ornithologists' Union (now the American Ornithological Society) accepted it as a separate species and other taxonomic systems followed suit. It is more closely related to the northern pygmy owl complex (G. gnoma sensu lato) than to the Andean. The species is monotypic.

Description

Adults have two color morphs, one mostly brown and the other rufous. The head and upperparts are the basal color with paler spots, and the tail is the same color with four white bands and a white tip. The nape has a pair of blackish spots with pale borders that resemble eyes. The breast and belly are white and the flanks are the basal color. The facial disc is the basal color with narrow buff and white marks. Its eyes and feet are yellow, the maxilla greenish yellow, and the mandible light brown with a yellow tip.

Distribution and habitat

The Costa Rican pygmy owl is found in the Cordillera Central and Cordillera de Talamanca of Costa Rica and patchily into far western Panama. It inhabits the canopy and edges of humid montane oak and evergreen forests.

Behavior

Movement

The Costa Rican pygmy owl is a year-round resident throughout its range.

Feeding

The Costa Rican pygmy owl forages both day and night. It hunts from a low perch in dense foliage and takes prey in "a short, swift dash". If the target is missed, the bird typically returns to the perch rather than pursuing. Its diet has not been defined in detail but is known to include birds, small mammals and other vertebrates, and large arthropods. Like other pygmy owls, they swish their tails from side to side when agitated.

Breeding

The Costa Rican pygmy owl's breeding phenology is not well known. It nests in tree cavities, perhaps mostly old woodpecker holes. One nest was found in March and contained three eggs.

Vocalization

The Costa Rican pygmy owl's song is "a long series of clear, unmodulated toots in an irregular rhythm". The toots can be in pairs, in a series of three pairs, or in a continuous series of single notes. When excited, it gives a faster, higher-pitched series of five toots.

Status

The IUCN has assessed the Costa Rican pygmy owl as being of Least Concern. Though its population size is not known, it is believed to be stable. No specific threats have been identified. It is considered rare in Panama and rare to locally fairly common in Costa Rica. "Human activity has little short-term direct effect on [the] Costa Rican Pygmy-Owl, other than the local effects of habitat destruction."

References

Costa Rican pygmy owl
Birds of the Talamancan montane forests
Costa Rican pygmy owl
Taxonomy articles created by Polbot